Tom Goes to the Mayor is an American adult animated series  created by Tim Heidecker and Eric Wareheim for Cartoon Network's late night programming block, Adult Swim. It premiered on November 14, 2004 and ended on September 25, 2006 with a total of thirty episodes.

History
Tom Goes to the Mayor began as a web cartoon on timanderic.com. It was popular enough to get a web sequel, in which David Cross guest stars. Bob Odenkirk noticed the show's potential, and began producing it for Adult Swim.

Adult Swim has described Tom Goes to the Mayor as "one of the most polarizing shows" they have ever had, indicating that viewers "either love it or hate it."

Overview
Tom Peters (Tim Heidecker) has just moved to Jefferton, an unpleasant, rundown town filled with strip malls and buffets. Episodes usually focus on Tom going to the mayor (Eric Wareheim), hence the title of the show, with various ideas for business and civic endeavors, and the Mayor tweaks those ideas and causes them to backfire in horrible and destructive ways, leaving Tom to answer for them.

The show features a crude but distinctive limited animation style made by taking photos of the cast with different facial expressions and body language. The photos are then filtered using the "photocopy" image filter in Adobe Photoshop, resulting in the show's unique monochromatic blue and white images resembling Ditto machine copies. There are some live-action scenes, usually on a television set within the show.

Many characters, segments, and content from Tom Goes to the Mayor have resurfaced in Tim and Eric Awesome Show, Great Job!, including the Channel 5 Married News Team, the Cinco Company, Gibbons, and even a live-action version of Tom Goes to the Mayor used as an opening for the episode "Pepperoni".

Characters

 Tom Peters (Tim Heidecker) – Tom Peters (né Pickle) is a 32-year-old entrepreneur whose ideas are often turned into disasters due to continuous inept interference from the mayor. Tom comes across as weak-willed, timid and lacking in self-esteem, never calling out the mayor on his irrational behavior and allowing himself to be used and manipulated by everyone he comes into contact with. He is often taunted by his stepchildren (from wife Joy's previous marriage), not to mention the rants he receives from Joy. Tom has no apparent job (besides "local entrepreneur") and drives a Maluch that has severe emission problems.  A common running gag on the show is that despite Tom's name being very simple, it is nearly always misspelled when written out, such as "Tom Petres", "Thom P. Tiers" and "Taumpy Tearrs." Another running gag to the show is Tom mispronouncing words; for example, when presenting his résumé to the Mayor, he pronounces it as "resume". He also never uses profanity and instead uses phrases like "shirt", "crickets", etc. – even going so far as to refer to a dam as a "darn". His first wife was a woman named Pat, who is now married to her husband Cal.
 The Mayor (Eric Wareheim) – The Mayor is a superficially friendly yet childish and sadistic man who often spends his working days watching the TV in his office. He often uses a condescending tone when speaking to Tom. He usually gains control of Tom's suggestions for the community and twists them into embarrassing and bizarre situations. According to the Adult Swim website, he has served Jefferton for the past twelve years, due to family connections, low voter turnout, and a strange local law which gives the mayor thirteen-year terms of office. However, it is worth noting that the Mayor has been in office since the Pioneer Island Theme Park burned down "20 years ago." The Mayor is married and has three sons. Throughout the series, the Mayor has displayed traits such as stupidity, insanity, selfishness and even wickedness.
 Joy Peters (Stephanie Courtney (voice), Michael Q. Schmidt (live action)) – Tom's obese, greedy and angry wife. She is very domineering and arrogant towards Tom and is a selfish and uncaring mother to her sons. Although her master bed is large, she makes Tom sleep on a cot off to the side. She is often seen hogging their computer—which she uses to chat with strange men—to the point where it impedes Tom's business schemes. Joy is gluttonous and often seen messily gobbling food.
 Tom's stepsons – Brandon, Brendon and Brindon are Joy's idiotic, destructive and deformed-looking children from her first marriage, who became Tom's stepsons. Renamed after a re-birthing process.
 Jan Skylar (Tim Heidecker)  & Wayne Skylar (Eric Wareheim) – "the only married news team in the tri-county area" are newscasters on Channel 5. After the series finished Jan and Wayne Skylar became recurring characters on Tim and Eric Awesome Show, Great Job! and Check It Out! with Dr. Steve Brule.
 The City Council (Craig Anton & Ron Lynch) – Jefferton's city council, who often meet at Gulliver's Buffet. They try to be the voice of reason when the mayor presents them with insane and nonsensical plans, but they don't put up much of a fight due to their overall unenthusiasm.
 Gibbons (Brian Posehn) – Tom's old "friend" from junior college, who suffers from a height disorder and speaks in monotone. Despite claiming to be friends, Tom will often uncharacteristically lose his patience with Gibbons and start to bully him.
 Renee the Receptionist (Stephanie Courtney) – The Mayor's bored receptionist.
 Bob Odenkirk often appears as various characters in many episodes, sometimes appearing in live-action instead of sketched.

Episodes

International broadcast
In Canada, Tom Goes to the Mayor previously aired on Teletoon's Teletoon at Night block and later G4's Adult Digital Distraction block. The series currently airs on the Canadian version of Adult Swim.

Home media
On April 3, 2007  the entire series was released on DVD. In addition to being available on DVD, Tom Goes to the Mayor is also available on iTunes.

References

External links

 

 Tim and Eric.com

2004 American television series debuts
2006 American television series endings
2000s American adult animated television series
American adult animated comedy television series
American stop-motion adult animated television series
English-language television shows
Adult Swim original programming
American television series with live action and animation
Television series based on Internet-based works
Television series by Abso Lutely Productions
Television series by Williams Street
Tim & Eric